Molecule Man is a series of aluminium sculptures, designed by American artist Jonathan Borofsky, installed at various locations around the world, including Germany and the United States.  Borofsky made the first Molecule Man sculptures for locations in Los Angeles in 1977 and 1978.  They were installed later in 1981 and 1983 (in Los Angeles and Beverly Hills, respectively).

The sculpture model depicts three human form silhouettes with hundreds of holes, leaning toward each other.  According to Borofsky, the holes represent "the molecules of all human beings coming together to create our existence." 

A related sculpture is Borofsky's Hammering Man.

References

External links 

 
 Molecule Man Sculpture, Los Angeles, California, United States

1977 sculptures
Aluminium sculptures
Buildings and structures in Treptow-Köpenick
Outdoor sculptures in Berlin
Outdoor sculptures in Greater Los Angeles
Outdoor sculptures in Iowa
Sculpture series
Sculptures by Jonathan Borofsky
Sculptures of men in California
Sculptures of men in Germany
Statues in Germany
Statues in Iowa
Statues in Los Angeles